Pyrrhus was an Athenian sculptor of 5th century BC. He is mentioned in the list of Pliny as the maker of bronze statues of Hygieia and Athena. In 1840, a base was found in the Acropolis of Athens, bearing the following inscription

References
Dictionary of Greek and Roman Biography and Mythology Pyrrhus artists.2
The Monuments of Athens: An Historical and Archaeological Description - Page 28 by Panagiotes G. Kastromenos, Agnes Smith Lewis 1884
Athens and Its Monuments Page 256 By Charles Heald Weller 1913

Ancient Athenian sculptors
5th-century BC Greek sculptors
Ancient Greek sculptors
Athena
Greek inscriptions